Shirvan (or) and until 1994 as Khoylu, is a village in the Shamakhi District of Azerbaijan. This village had a generally homogeneous Armenian population in 1918 and maintained an Armenian majority up until the forced exodus of Armenians from Azerbaijan in 1988.

References

External links 

Populated places in Shamakhi District